Malostranské náměstí is the main square of Prague's Malá Strana. St. Nicholas Church and the adjacent building complex divides the square in an upper (western) and lower (eastern) part. From the square Mostecká ulice leads out to the Charles Bridge.

References

Squares in Prague